The Fortress Stadium (shortened as simply Fortress) is a popular large area of open space consisting of shopping centers, restaurants, cafés and entertainment areas and a sports stadium. It is located in Lahore Cantt, Lahore, Pakistan. Among the likes of M. M. Alam Road and Liberty Market in Gulberg, this area is a popular locale for the urban youth in Lahore. Fortress Stadium is also one of the most busy commercial areas of the city. The Chairman and Management of Fortress Stadium are serving and retired army officers. Brigadier Sikandar Khan was the Chairman Fortress Stadium (Lahore) from 2012 to 2013.

Attractions

Fortress Square, a shopping mall
Joyland, an amusement park
Sindbad, children's play area
Pace Shopping Mall
Expo Centre Lahore (a new building opened in 2010 in the area)

National Horse and Cattle Show
The Stadium is the site of the famous National Horse and Cattle Show which is one of the most famous festivals of Lahore. This includes a display of livestock, but also many spectacular feats of horsemanship, tent pegging, dressage, camel dancing, racing, folk dances, pomp, pageantry, mass-band displays and grand fireworks in the evening. It was accompanied by exhibition displaying Pakistani craftsmanship and industry.

See also
M. M. Alam Road

References

External links
Fortress Stadium (Lahore) shopping area on YouYube
Fortress Stadium (Lahore) shopping mall on YouTube

Entertainment districts in Pakistan
Shopping districts and streets in Pakistan
Buildings and structures in Lahore
Restaurants in Lahore
Tourist attractions in Lahore
Music venues in Pakistan
Lahore Cantonment